Amritpal Singh (born January 5, 1991) is an Indian professional basketball player who represents Punjab at the National Basketball Championship. In the past, he played for the Sydney Kings of the Australian National Basketball League.

Early life
Amritpal Singh comes from a family of farmers. He began playing basketball in 2009, after playing kabaddi as a youth. In March 2010, he joined the Ludhiana Basketball Academy.

Professional career
In August 2015, Amritpal Singh signed with Tokyo Excellence of Japan's National Basketball Development League (NBDL). After putting up impressive performances in the BJ Challenge Summer League from June to August playing for the Hyogo Impulse team, Singh secured a one-year contract with the Tokyo team. In March 2016, he helped Tokyo Excellence win the 2015–16 NBDL Championship.

In April 2017, Singh impressed a number of teams at the NBL Draft Combine in Melbourne. He participate in the combine alongside fellow Indian players Amjyot Singh, Yadwinder Singh and Vishesh Bhriguvanshi. Two months later, Singh was invited to join the Sydney Kings for a tournament in China, known as the Atlas Challenge 2017.

On 30 August 2017, Singh signed with the Sydney Kings for the 2017–18 NBL season, becoming the first Indian-born player to be signed by an Australian NBL team. In 24 games, he averaged 2.1 points and 1.4 rebounds per game.

National team career
Singh made his debut for the Indian national team in 2011 at the FIBA Asia Championship. He has since competed at the 2013 FIBA Asia Championship, 2014 FIBA Asia Cup, 2015 FIBA Asia Championship, 2016 FIBA Asia Challenge, 2016 FIBA Asia Champions Cup and 2017 FIBA Asia Cup. At the 2016 FIBA Asia Challenge in Iran, Singh averaged 18 points and 10 rebounds per game.

References

External links
Amritpal Singh at fiba.basketball
REAL GM Player Profile

1991 births
Living people
Basketball players at the 2014 Asian Games
Basketball players from Punjab, India
Centers (basketball)
Indian expatriates in Australia
Indian expatriates in Japan
Indian men's basketball players
Sydney Kings players
Yokohama Excellence players
Asian Games competitors for India